Bruno Goes dos Santos (born January 20, 2001, São Paulo), better known as Nobru, is a Brazilian streamer, digital influencer, professional Free Fire player and businessman.

Biography 
Bruno was born on January 20, 2001, in the city of São Paulo and always dreamed of being a soccer player, but ended up investing in the games area.
His passion for electronic sports came when he started playing Free Fire — at the time, on his father's cell phone. His father, unemployed and in need of the device to deliver CVs, did not accept his son's decision well, but Bruno did not stop and, at the age of 18, he took the game seriously.
In 2019, Nobru was hired by Corinthians, which that year debuted in the Free Fire professional league. In the same year, the team was Free Fire world champion, with Nobru being the MVP. Nobru was also chosen as the best Free Fire athlete of 2019.

Awards and nominations

References 

Brazilian esports players
Twitch (service) streamers
2001 births
Living people